Gastone de Murols (died 20 June 1172) was the sixth Grand Master of the Knights Hospitaller from 1170 until his death in 1172. He succeeded Gilbert of Aissailly as Grand Master and was succeeded by Jobert of Syria.

Biography 
Gastone (Caste) de Murols was from a family having its origin in Murols and was therefore was from Auvergne. He began as treasurer of the Order, a position he fulfilled following Géraud de Saint-André. He occupied the post beginning 1163 –1167, a position he held until his election as Grand Master.

He was appointed by Gilbert of Aissailly to succeed him in 1170. His election was recognized by only a part of the knights. The dissidents sided with the authority of a certain Rostang, a character known only by his seal, dividing the Order for the first time. This split was short-lived since the death of Gastone took place just two years later.

See also

 Cartulaire général de l'Ordre des Hospitaliers
 List of Knights Hospitaller sites
 Langue (Knights Hospitaller)
 Flags of the Knights Hospitaller

References

Bibliography

External links
Caste de Murols. French Wikipedia.
Liste des grands maîtres de l'ordre de Saint-Jean de Jérusalem. French Wikipedia.
Eugène Harot, Essai d’armorial des Grands-Maîtres de l’Ordre de Saint Jean de Jérusalem.
Cast de Murois. SMOM.
Seals of the Grand Masters. Museum of the Order of St John.

Knights Hospitaller
Grand Masters of the Knights Hospitaller
13th-century deaths
Year of death uncertain
Year of birth unknown
13th-century French people
People from Aveyron